This is a list of units from Mississippi that served in the Union during the American Civil War. Only a single unit of white Union troops was raised within the state, along with several regiments of African-American volunteers, eventually becoming part of the United States Colored Troops. The list of Confederate Mississippi units is shown separately.

Units
1st Battalion, Mississippi Mounted Rifles (Union)
1st Mississippi Cavalry Regiment (African Descent) – redesignated 3rd U.S. Colored Cavalry Regiment
1st Mississippi Heavy Artillery Regiment (African Descent) – redesignated 5th U.S. Colored Heavy Artillery Regiment
2nd Mississippi Heavy Artillery Regiment (African Descent) – redesignated 6th U.S. Colored Heavy Artillery Regiment
1st Mississippi Infantry Regiment (African Descent) – redesignated 51st U.S. Colored Infantry Regiment
2nd Mississippi Infantry Regiment (African Descent) – redesignated 52nd U.S. Colored Infantry Regiment
3rd Mississippi Infantry Regiment (African Descent) – redesignated 53rd U.S. Colored Infantry Regiment
4th Mississippi Infantry Regiment (African Descent) – redesignated 66th U.S. Colored Infantry Regiment
5th Mississippi Infantry Regiment (African Descent) – organization not completed
6th Mississippi Infantry Regiment (African Descent) – redesignated 58th U.S. Colored Infantry Regiment

See also
Lists of American Civil War Regiments by State
Mississippi in the American Civil War
Southern Unionists
United States Colored Troops

References
Dyer, Frederick H. (1959). A Compendium of the War of the Rebellion. New York and London. Thomas Yoseloff, Publisher. 
Mississippi Union Regimental Index at The Civil War Archive
1st Mississippi Mounted Rifles: Mississippi’s Union Battalion in the Civil War

Mississippi
Civil War
Mississippi in the American Civil War